Swarnamalya Ganesh is an Indian dancer, actress and TV anchor.

She received the award "Yuvakala Bharat" at the age of 17.  Her first major role in television was on the Sun TV show Ilamai Pudhumai and then went on to do a number of films in the Tamil language.

Dance career 
Ganesh started performing onstage from age 12, when she did her arangetram with Avvai Natarajan and Padma Subrahmanyam. Apart from dancing in sabhas of India such as the Narada Gana Sabha, Krishna Gana Sabha and the Vishaka Music Academy, she has performed in other festivals such as the India International centre, New Delhi, Modhera Sun Temple festival, the Henry Martin peace festival.

From The Attic 
Ganesh's doctoral work was The research and reconstruction of lost repertoires of the Nayaka Period in Early Modern South India. This series opens with Stories from the Attic, a lecture on the dance histories and contexts of Early Modern Era. Beholding the Attic is a special travelling exhibition curated to showcase rare sculptures, murals, scripts, costumes and photographs of courtesans of the 16th–20th centuries. The performance of From The Attic features repertoires like Mukhacali, Jakkini (Persianite influenced dance), Perani (A five act theatrical repertoire), Gondali (Marathi influenced), oriental padams (Works of Ruth. St. Denis, Ted Shawn, Ester Sherman and others).

Nayaka repertoires reconstructed by her:
 Gondhali
 Sivalila
 Jakkini
 Perani (Perini)
 Bahucari
 Char cari
 Danda Lasyam
 Duru Padam
 Nava Padam
 Kelikai
 Mukhacali

Publications (selected) 

 Kshetrayya and the legacy of erasing women's voices from erotic poetry, The News Minute, Feb 2020, Chennai https://www.thenewsminute.com/article/kshetrayya-and-legacy-erasing-women-s-voices-erotic-poetry-118165
 Whose aesthetic is it anyway? Why classical arts must become more inclusive, The News Minute, April 2019, Chennai
 Nammai Marandarai Naam Marakkamattom. Dr. Swarnamalya Ganesh.; published by South Indian Social History Research Institute (SISHRI); 2014. 
 Dance History enshrined and decoded- Bharatanrityam and Bharatanatyam; published by Nartanam Dance Journal, Hyderabad. 2016
 Through the Sheer of Gossamer" for NCPA OnSTAGE, Mumbai
 Daughters of Pandanallur- the other story (Dance and history of the 28 Kilometer From Pandanallur to Kumbhakonam), The Kalakshetra Journal Vol IV, 2015 
 Discursive_Arguments_Dr_Swarnamalya_Ganesh Sex and Gender in Performance- Locating Power and Resistance as Discursive arguments, SNC Journal of Intercultural Philosophy, Chennai. Vol 28, Oct 2015; pp. 45–54
 Disrespecting the Devadasi: What the MS Subhalakshmi debate has exposed, The News Minute, Chennai. 
 "Writings as operations of en(dis)franchisement, investigating manuscripts and choreographer's notes from the 16th-19th centuries. Advantages and problems in reconstructing from the papers" as part of Writing dance and dancing writing conference proceedings of Society of Dance History Scholars, USA
 Notions of "Classical" in Bharatanatyam; a cultural operation of the classes- arguments of cosmopolitan Margi and indigenous Desi, repertoires of the Nayak period"; Kalakshetra Journal, Issue 2. 
 Mired in Dravidian Politics: Were Tamil Nadu’s Isai Vellalars always socially backward? The News Minute, Chennai
 "Womanity--- selfhood and tenacity as keynotes of Sangam women" published essay as part of Voyages of the body and soul, selected female icons of India and beyond; Edited by Ketu Katrak & Anita Ratnam, Cambridge University Press, 2014
 "Past performing practices of the Nayak period as vestibule to today's Bharatanatyam", The Madras Music Academy Journal; Vol 84, 2013, pp 10–118
 "How the art of the Devadasi is appropriated to create the world of Bharatanatyam", The News Minute, Chennai. Feb 2017
 "What's In a Name; Sadir and its Arguments", Journal for India International Center, New Delhi, Oct 2015
 Regular contributor for OJAS-Oriental Journal of Asian Studies, SASTRA University, department of Oriental studies-Peer Reviewed
 "Stripling rogue at the shrine of the neat herd: A review of the Karana panels at the Sarngapani temple", Kumbhakonam (December 2012), pp. 47–61
 Presented research paper "Past performing practices of the Nayak period: Research and reconstruction" for the C. P. Arts foundation
 Womanity- Selfhood and Tenacity as keynotes for Sangam women, OJAS, 2013 (March) ISSN 2319-717X
 Book - Raghunathabhyudayamu- transliteration and translation, a yakshaganam work in Telugu written by King Vijayaraghava Nayaka in the 17th century (forthcoming)
 "Ravana Hatta, Ravana hasta and the Modern Violin, CARVA Academy of Violin, 2010 Rasa theory and Sigmund Freud—a psychological interpretation" Journal of the University of Madras, 150th year special issue, 2008
 Editor of the monthly Newsletter for Association of Bharatanatyam Artistes of India (ABHAI); issues--- 25 issues, 2005, 2006
 Founder editor of Tha Dhim the journal of the Department of Indian Music, University of Madras, 2007
 Submits articles and research papers for academic journals and annals on dance history including for the Society of Dance History Scholars (SDHS) U.S.
 Decolonising Dance History project- "Why we must not write a book on Devadasi (alternative ways of writing subaltern history)", PRAXIS, India; Oct 2020.

Film career 
She made her film debut through Maniratnam's Alaipayuthey, where she played the role of Shalini's elder sister Poorni.

She did only a few high-profile films such as Manobala's Naan Paata Ninepaethellam opposite Ramesh Aravind, a remake of the Hindi film Abhimaan (1973). Later she played roles in Mozhi and Engal Anna .

Filmography

Television career
She began as a television anchor in Sun TV's show Illamai Pudumai. She also was the anchor of Vijay TV's Kalakka Povadhu Yaaru Part 2. She has also done Anbulla Sneghithi. After this, she also acted in Bharathiraja's Thekkathu Ponnu, Jaya TV's Vandhaale Maharasi, Revathi's Yaathumaagi Nindraal and also played a guest role in Sun TV's Thangam.
Television performances 
Sun TV, Vijay TV, Raj TV, Kalaignar TV, K TV,Sakti TV (Colombo), Vasantam Central (Malaysia)

Television appearances

References

External links
 
  Swarnamalya site

Living people
Television personalities from Tamil Nadu
Tamil actresses
Actresses in Malayalam cinema
Actresses in Tamil cinema
Actresses in Kannada cinema
San Jose State University alumni
University of Madras alumni
Indian film actresses
21st-century Indian actresses
Actresses in Tamil television
Year of birth missing (living people)